Ann Baker (August 21, 1915 – August 29, 1999) was an American jazz singer. Baker was discovered by Louie Armstrong and played with his band on Broadway. She is best known for her time spent as a member of Billy Eckstine's band, "The Dream Band" where she performed with Charlie Parker, Dizzy Gillespie, Dexter Gordon, Miles Davis and Art Blakey. In 2008, Baker was inducted into the West Virginia Musician Hall of Fame.

References

Musicians from Charleston, West Virginia
American women jazz singers
American jazz singers
Singers from West Virginia
People from Washington, Pennsylvania
Jazz musicians from West Virginia
1915 births
1999 deaths
20th-century American singers
20th-century American women singers
Jazz musicians from Pennsylvania